Dragan Popadić (born 4 February 1946) is a Serbian football manager and former player who played as a midfielder

References

1946 births
Living people
Yugoslav footballers
Association football midfielders
FK Radnički Beograd players
NK Olimpija Ljubljana (1945–2005) players
OFK Beograd players
HFC Haarlem players
Lierse S.K. players
Eredivisie players
Yugoslav expatriate footballers
Expatriate footballers in the Netherlands
Yugoslav expatriate sportspeople in the Netherlands
Expatriate footballers in Belgium
Yugoslav expatriate sportspeople in Belgium
Serbian football managers
Girabola managers
Ghana Premier League managers
Ethiopian Premier League managers
Simba S.C. managers
Atlético Petróleos de Luanda managers
Rwanda national football team managers
King Faisal Babes F.C. managers
Serbian expatriate football managers
Expatriate football managers in Uganda
Serbian expatriate sportspeople in Uganda
Expatriate football managers in Tanzania
Serbian expatriate sportspeople in Tanzania
Expatriate football managers in Angola
Serbian expatriate sportspeople in Angola
Expatriate football managers in Rwanda
Serbian expatriate sportspeople in Rwanda
Expatriate football managers in Ghana
Serbian expatriate sportspeople in Ghana
Expatriate football managers in Ethiopia
Serbian expatriate sportspeople in Ethiopia